Microschema is a genus of treehoppers in the family Membracidae, containing the single species Microschema straminicolor.

References

Membracinae
Auchenorrhyncha genera
Monotypic Hemiptera genera